Youra may refer to:

Youra (singer) (born 1993), a South Korean singer-songwriter
Islet of Youra (or Gioura), a small Greek island